Zaroshchenske is a rural settlement in Shakhtarsk Raion, Donetsk Oblast, eastern Ukraine. As of 2001 it had a population of 348 people.

Since August 2014, it has been under the occupation of pro-Russian forces.

References

Rural settlements in Donetsk Oblast